"Te Amaré" (I Will Love You) was the fourth single released by Gloria Estefan on her tenth studio album Unwrapped. The single was exclusively released in Spain, where it became a hit.

Charts
"Te Amaré" was released only at Spain, and reached the top ten of the singles chart.

References

Spanish-language songs
Gloria Estefan songs
2004 singles
2003 songs
Songs written by Gloria Estefan
Songs written by Emilio Estefan
Epic Records singles